This page lists the World Best Year Performance in the year 1990 in the men's decathlon. One of the main events during this season were the 1990 European Championships in Split, Yugoslavia, where the competition started on August 28, 1990, and ended on August 29, 1990.

Records

1990 World Year Ranking

See also
1990 Hypo-Meeting
1990 Décastar

References
decathlon2000
apulanta
digilander

1990
Decathlon Year Ranking, 1990